125 Squadron may refer to:

 No. 125 Squadron RCAF, Canada
 125 Squadron (Israel)
 No. 125 Helicopter Squadron, IAF, India
 125 Squadron, Republic of Singapore Air Force
 No. 125 Squadron RAF, United Kingdom
 125th Air Transport Squadron, United States Air Force
 125th Fighter Squadron, United States Air Force
 125th Observation Squadron, United States Air Force
 125th Special Tactics Squadron, United States Air Force
 VAW-125, United States Navy
 VFA-125, United States Navy
 VA-125 (U.S. Navy), United States Navy
 Second VA-125 (U.S. Navy)
 VPB-125, United States Navy